Anum-Boso is a town in the Eastern Region of Ghana.

References

Populated places in the Eastern Region (Ghana)
Villages in Ghana